"Chequered Love" is the second single by British singer Kim Wilde. The song was released in the spring of 1981 to follow Wilde's successful debut "Kids in America". As with that single, writing credits were given to Wilde's father and brother Marty and Ricky Wilde, with the latter also being given production credits. The 12" version is no longer in length than the 7"; however, better sound quality is achieved by the grooves not being as compressed - a common practice for "marketing" during the 1980s. The song later appeared on Wilde's self-titled debut album.

Lyrically, the song describes how opposites attract, and was inspired by Wilde's parents who are very different people. "Chequered Love" became another hit for Wilde, reaching the number four on the UK Singles Chart, number one in South Africa (succeeding "Kids in America"), and peaking inside the top 10 all around the world except North America. It was certified gold in the UK, and has sold over a million copies worldwide. The song was also followed by a music video directed by Brian Grant, which was set in a steamy bathroom with black tiles on the walls.

Track listing
7" / 12"
 Chequered Love (3:20)
 Shane (3:39)

7" (US)
 Chequered Love (3:20)
 Everything We Know (3:42)

Charts

Weekly charts

Year-end charts

References

1981 singles
1981 songs
Kim Wilde songs
Number-one singles in South Africa
RAK Records singles
Songs written by Ricky Wilde
Songs written by Marty Wilde